Hound-Dog Man is a 1959 film directed by Don Siegel, based on the 1947 novel by Fred Gipson, and starring Fabian, Carol Lynley, and Stuart Whitman.

Plot
In 1912, Clint McKinney and his younger brother Spud talk their father Aaron into letting them go on a hunting trip with their older friend, the womanizing Blackie Scantling. Aaron agrees despite the reluctance of his wife Cora.

Cast
 Fabian as Clint McKinney
 Stuart Whitman as Blackie Scantling 
 Carol Lynley as Dony Wallace 
 Arthur O'Connell as Aaron McKinney 
 Dodie Stevens as Nita Stringer 
 Betty Field as Cora McKinney 
 Royal Dano as Fiddling Tom Waller 
 Margo Moore as Susie Bell Payson 
 Claude Akins as Hog Peyson 
 Edgar Buchanan as Doc Cole 
 Jane Darwell as Grandma Wilson 
 L.Q. Jones as Dave Wilson 
 Virginia Gregg as Amy Waller 
 Dennis Holmes as Spud McKinney 
 Rachel Stephens as Rachel Wilson

As of December 18, 2020, only one of the three principal players, Fabian, is still alive.

Original novel

The original book was published in 1949, seven years before Gipson's better known Old Yeller (1956).

Gipson said when he started writing he intended it to be "a short semi fact article for a men's magazine" but that it "just grew and grew. I was writing about real people straight out of my childhood and I couldn't seem to get them stopped and finally wound up with a complete novel." He started it in 1944, put it aside, and returned to it in 1946. It was originally called Clipped Wings. It was finished in 1947 and published in 1949. The book sold well and was published in a number of languages.

Gipson said reaction to the novel "was sometimes gratifying and sometimes bewilderingly unpleasant... It was just a book of little boys on a coon hunt."

It would remain Gipson's favorite book among his own works. He tried to write a sequel but was unable to finish it.

Don Siegel, who directed the film, called it "a delightful, funny book... I loved its simplicity."

Production

Development
In 1952 Ida Lupino expressed interest in obtaining the film rights, as a possible vehicle for Robert Mitchum.

In 1955 Filmmakers Inc announced they would make the film along with an adaptation of The Quick and the Dead.

20th Century Fox bought the film rights in March 1958 following the success of the film of Old Yeller. It was assigned to prolific producer Jerry Wald who hired director Don Siegel. Siegel later wrote "I had never done a picture in this genre. It was a elcome change of pace to directed a film that children could go see. I wish I could do more. My reputation may be as a director of violence.... but that doesn't mean I can't, or don't want to do comedy, or love stories. My favourite picture is Brief Encounter."

Gipson was signed to write the script. According to his biographer "changes in the story of Blackie Scanlon incite Gipson to uncontrollable rages and Tommie Gipson [his wife] arbitrates all further revisions." (The author would later be given shock treatment for depression and imprisoned for assault.)

Casting
Ricky Nelson, Lyndsay Crosby, and David Ladd were mentioned early on as possible stars, along with Stuart Whitman, who did wind up playing the title role. Tuesday Weld was at one stage mentioned as a possible female lead. Whitman was cast in March 1959.

The movie eventually became a starring vehicle for Fabian, who had released a series of hit singles. 20th Century Fox had enjoyed success launching pop stars Elvis Presley and Pat Boone into film careers and thought they could do the same with Fabian. He was paid $35,000 for ten weeks work.

Siegel said Wald wanted Fabian to "sing at least twelve songs in the picture. Fabian, though one of the nicest kids I ever mat, couldn't sing and knew it... I wanted to make Fred Gipson's excellent novel into a film which didn't feature any songs. Wald turned me down flat."

Wald tried to get Jayne Mansfield to play the part of a blousy barmaid but was unsuccessful.

Dodie Stevens was cast because Wald's teenage sons liked her song "Pink Shoe Laces".

Shooting
Filming started July 27, 1959 and took place through August and September.

Siegel said he "decided to have as much fun with the picture as possible. All but one of Fabian's songs were interrupted abruptly." This happens four times in the movie.

LQ Jones later recalled that Fabian "was not that talented as an actor, but he worked hard and was just a nice person." Siegel wrote that "Wald seemed puzzled at how easily the picture went together."

Songs

The movie featured the following songs:
"Hound Dog Man" (by Doc Pomus and Mort Shuman) performed by Fabian
"I'm Growin' Up" (by Robert P. Marcucci and Peter De Angelis) performed by Fabian and Dennis Holmes, while Stuart Whitman whistles
"Single" (by Robert P. Marcucci and Peter De Angelis) performed by Fabian, Whitman and Dennis Holmes
"This Friendly World" (by Robert P. Marcucci and Peter De Angelis) performed by Fabian
"Pretty Little Girl" (by Robert P. Marcucci and Peter De Angelis) performed by Fabian and men's chorus at the barn dance
"What Big Boy" (by Sol Ponti and Frankie Avalon) performed by Dodie Stevens
"Hay Foot, Straw-Foot" (by Richard M. Sherman and Robert B. Sherman) performed by square dance caller Fenton Jones
Another song was cut from the film - "Got the Feeling" (by Richard M. Sherman and Robert B. Sherman) sung by Fabian.

"Hound Dog Man" was a hit single, reaching number 9 on the US charts. "This Friendly World" reached number 12.

Reception
The film had its world premiere in Monroe, Louisiana, on 27 October 1959.

Box Office
The film was not a commercial success, failing to make the Variety list of films that earned $1 million or more in rentals for 1959.

Fox executives later put this down to public rejection of Fabian, in particular the fact that his fans were very young and not ticket-buying teenagers.

Critical
According to one review it was a "slice-of-life, coming-of-age piece – a little hunting, some singing, Claude Akins pops around periodically to snarl at Whitman, Lynley pants over Whitman as does Akins’ wife. There’s a comic doctor, a dog, a barn dance. It’s actually a sweet film – well made, with great production values, and a very strong cast."

Siegel said "it's difficult to get over in a precis the fun, the beauty, the splendid acting, the wondrous feeling of robust freedom in Hound Dog Man" calling Whitman "a brilliant actor." However he also added "Sam Peckinpah wanted to do a picture based strictly on the book. I'm sorry he didn't do it. He would have done it the way it should have been made - small."

However, Fox later found Fabian could be effective in supporting roles of major stars for the studios, such as John Wayne in North to Alaska and Bing Crosby in High Time.

Fabian later reflected in 1971 that he thought the title was to blame for the film's poor box office reception. "It was a good story with a great cast... but "Hound Dog Man"?"

References

Sources

External links

Hound Dog Man at TCMDB
Review of film at New York Times
Complete novel at Internet Archive

1959 films
1950s musical comedy-drama films
20th Century Fox films
American musical comedy-drama films
Films based on American novels
Films directed by Don Siegel
Films scored by Cyril J. Mockridge
Films set in 1912
1959 comedy films
1959 drama films
CinemaScope films
1950s English-language films
1950s American films